"The Domino Theory" is a song written by Bill LaBounty and Beckie Foster, and recorded by American country music artist Steve Wariner.  It was released in March 1990 as the first single from the album Laredo.  The song reached #7 on the Billboard Hot Country Singles & Tracks chart.

Critical reception
A review of the song in Cash Box was favorable, stating that it "has that prefect radio tempo and is one of those songs you find yourself singing along with the first time you hear it."

Chart performance

Year-end charts

References

1990 singles
Steve Wariner songs
Songs written by Bill LaBounty
MCA Records singles
Songs written by Beckie Foster
1990 songs